
At least three French privateers during the Napoleonic Wars were named Dame Ernouf, for Geneviève Miloent, wife of Jean Augustin Ernouf, governor of Guadeloupe:

 Dame Ernouf (1805–1805), was a 200-ton brig with a crew of about 100 men and armed with sixteen 6-pounder guns. Seaforth foundered later that year.

 Dame Ernouf (1806–1806), was a privateer of 150 men and 17 guns.  captured her on 30 March 1806. 

  became the privateer Diligent and was last mentioned in December 1813

See also

Citations

References

 
 
 

Privateer ships of France
Ship names